Kristiyan Aleksandrov Malinov (born 30 March 1994) is a Bulgarian professional footballer who plays as a midfielder for Belgian First Division A club OH Leuven and the Bulgarian national team.

Born in Petrich, Malinov began his youth career with Belasitsa and spent three years in the academy before moving to Pirin 2001. In 2008, he joined Litex Lovech, where he developed in their academy and became a professional in 2013. Malinov made his senior debut while on loan at Dobrudzha in the 2013–14 season, before he broke into Litex's first team during following campaign. In June 2016, he joined CSKA Sofia.

In 2015, Malinov won his first cap for Bulgaria, having previously played for the under-21 team.

Career

Litex Lovech
Malinov joined Litex Lovech's Academy as a fourteen-year-old after playing junior football for his home-town club Belasitsa Petrich and Pirin 2001. He progressed through the club's youth system and made his first appearance in a senior match day squad in November 2011, sitting on the bench for an A Group match against Lokomotiv Plovdiv.

Loan to Dobrudzha
In July 2013, Malinov was loaned to B Group team Dobrudzha Dobrich for the 2013–14 season. He made his debut in a 1–0 home win over Akademik Svishtov on 3 August 2013. Coached by former Litex's forward Svetoslav Todorov, Malinov made an immediate impact, appearing in all 26 league matches, scoring four goals. He was substituted only once during the entire league season in the second division.

Return to Litex
Malinov returned to Litex at the end of the season. He made his debut in the team's opening league match of the 2014–15 campaign against CSKA Sofia on 20 July 2014, playing the full 90 minutes in the centre of midfield. On 14 September, he scored his first goal in a 2–0 home win over Haskovo. On 29 November 2014, Malinov opened the scoring against Levski Sofia at Georgi Asparuhov Stadium. Later in the match Litex went 2–1 down, but Malinov created Litex's second goal, which was scored by Kiril Despodov for a 2–2 draw.

CSKA Sofia
In June 2016 Malinov and a big part of the Litex squad moved to CSKA Sofia since the team took the license of Litex for Bulgarian First League. For four seasons he played a total of 129 games with the club in all competitions, in which he scored 7 goals and recorded 14 assists.

OH Leuven
Malinov joined Belgian club Oud-Heverlee Leuven on 19 August 2020. On 22 August, he made his debut in a 3–1 home defeat against Charleroi, playing the full 90 minutes.

International career
On 7 February 2015, Malinov made his first appearance for Bulgaria, in the 0–0 draw with Romania in a non-official friendly match, being replaced in the 63rd minute by Stefan Velev. He earned his first cap on 8 June 2015, in the 0–4 loss against Turkey in another exhibition game, after coming on as a substitute during the second half.

Statistics

Club

International

References

External links

1994 births
Living people
Bulgarian footballers
Bulgaria youth international footballers
Bulgaria under-21 international footballers
Bulgaria international footballers
PFC Litex Lovech players
PFC Dobrudzha Dobrich players
PFC CSKA Sofia players
Oud-Heverlee Leuven players
First Professional Football League (Bulgaria) players
Second Professional Football League (Bulgaria) players
Belgian Pro League players
Expatriate footballers in Belgium
Bulgarian expatriate sportspeople in Belgium
Association football midfielders
People from Petrich
Sportspeople from Blagoevgrad Province